Haltota is a city located in Western Province, Sri Lanka.  It is a legendary city related to the King Raigam Bandara.
Postal code of Haltota sub post office is 12538

References

Populated places in Western Province, Sri Lanka